M.A.M. College of Engineering (MAMCE) is located in Trichy Tamil Nadu, India. It was founded in 1998. The college was established on 10 February 1999 with the approval of Tamil Nadu Government and All India Council for Technical Education and is affiliated to Anna University Chennai. It is one among the Muslim-minority institutions in Trichy.

Location
M.A.M. College of Engineering is located on the Trichy–Chennai trunk road at Siruganur, 8 km from Samayapuram.

Courses offered with AICTE approved intake

Undergraduate programmes
B.E. Computer Science and Engineering
B.E. Electronics and Communication Engineering
B.E. Electrical and Electronics Engineering
B.E. Electronics and Instrumentation Engineering
B.Tech. Information Technology
B.Tech. artificial intelligence and data science
B.E. Mechanical Engineering
B.E. Civil Engineering

Postgraduate programmes
M.E. Computer Science and Engineering 36
M.E. Electronics and Communication Engineering 18
M.E. Computer and Communication 18
M.E. Power Electronics and Drives 18
M.E. Environmental Engineering 18
M.E. Manufacturing Engineering 18
MBA Master of Business Administration
MCA Master of Computer Applications

Administration
The college is administered by the Managing Committee, the Governing Council, and Technical Advisory Committee.

References

External links
 

All India Council for Technical Education
Private engineering colleges in Tamil Nadu
Colleges affiliated to Anna University
Universities and colleges in Tiruchirappalli